Fitnat al-Wahhabiyya is a booklet written by Ahmad Zayni Dahlan (1816/17–1886) the Grand Mufti of the Shafi'is in Mecca in the late years of the Ottoman Empire.

Dahlan wrote this work against the Wahhabi creed and he sharply inveighed against it, and called them an evil sect. He criticised the Wahhabis for declaring Muslims to be infidels and polytheists. He also accused the Wahhabis of extremism for killing their Muslim opponents.

The book describes the history of the heretical tenets of Wahhabism in Najd and the Hijaz and the tortures of the Wahhabis inflicted upon Muslims; in which Dahlan exposed and refuted some of what he saw and witnessed from the Wahhabi extreme and terrorist acts and crimes besides their radical beliefs and misguidance in aqidah (Islamic creed).

During the time that Wahhabism was rapidly spreading. He wrote:

See also 
 Memoirs of Mr. Hempher, The British Spy to the Middle East
 Wahhabi War
 Wahhabi sack of Karbala
 Nejd Expedition
 Hadith of Najd
 Khawarij

References

External links 
 An overview of Wahhabism by Shaykh al Islam Ahmad Zayni Dahlan
 The Wahabi Tribulation — As-Sunnah Foundation of America
 Book: Fitnat-ul-Wahhabiyyah (The Wahhabi Tribulation)
 Les savants de La Mecque et Médine déclarent mécréant les wahhabites (rapporté par Ibn Zayni Dahlân) 
 Download the Book in English
 Download the Book in Arabic

1878 books
Books about Wahhabism
History books about Islam
Books about Islam
Ash'ari literature
Sunni literature
Islamic theology books
Islamic belief and doctrine
History of Hejaz